Guy Clark (1941–2016) was an American musician.

Guy Clark or Clarke may also refer to:
Guy Clark (album)
Guy Clarke (ambassador), List of ambassadors of the United Kingdom to Nepal

See also
Sir Guy Clarke-Travers, 3rd Baronet (1842–1905) of the Clarke-Travers baronets
Clarke (surname)